Zittau station is a railway station in Zittau, Germany. The station is located on the Liberec–Zittau, Zittau–Löbau and Zittau–Hagenwerder standard gauge lines as well as it is one terminus of narrow gauge Zittau–Kurort Oybin/Kurort Jonsdorf railway. Until 1945 narrow gauge Zittau–Hermsdorf railway to today's Bogatynia in Poland and Heřmanice in the Czech Republic also began at Zittau station.

The standard gauge parts of the station are operated by DB Station&Service (platforms) and DB Netz (tracks), narrow gauge parts by Saxon-Upper Lusatian Railway Company.

Services

Railway services 
As of May 2017 there are hourly services to Bischofswerda and Dresden (lines RE 2 and RB 61 run by Vogtlandbahn), to Liberec (lines RE 2 and L 7 run by Vogtlandbahn), Varnsdorf–Rybniště/Seifhennersdorf (line L 7 run by Vogtlandbahn) and to Görlitz and Cottbus (line OE 65 run by Ostdeutsche Eisenbahn). Narrow gauge services to Kurort Oybin and/or Kurort Jonsdorf run five times daily during main tourist seasons, two times daily during off-season. On summer weekend days there are three additional pairs of trains, which makes a peak of up to eight daily trains on summer weekend days.

Local transport 
City bus lines A, B and C as well as many regional bus lines frequently stop at this station. The bus station is located in front of the railway station building.

Station overview 
The standard gauge facilities are situated north of the station building, the narrow gauge facilities south of it. The narrow gauge passenger station is located east of the square with the bus stop, a depot west of it.

References

External links 
 

Railway stations in Saxony
Railway stations in Germany opened in 1848
railway station